The Tavy is a river on Dartmoor, Devon, England. The name derives from the Brythonic root "Tam", once thought to mean 'dark' but now generally understood to mean 'to flow'.  It has given its name to the town of Tavistock and the villages of Mary Tavy and Peter Tavy.
It is a tributary of the River Tamar and has as its own tributaries:
Collybrooke
River Burn
River Wallabrooke
River Lumburn
River Walkham

At Tavistock it feeds a canal running to Morwellham Quay.

Its mouth is crossed by the Tavy Bridge which carries the Tamar Valley railway line.

Navigation
The river is navigable inland as far as Lopwell, where a weir marks the normal tidal limit, about a  journey from North Corner Quay at Devonport. River transport was an important feature of the local farming, mining, tourism and forestry economies.

The Queen's Harbour Master for Plymouth is responsible for managing navigation on the River Tavy up to the normal tidal limit.

See also
Tamar–Tavy Estuary SSSI

Bibliography
Armstrong, Robin (1985) The Painted Stream, London: Dent

References

Tavy, River
River navigations in the United Kingdom
1Tavy